Mary Fitzgerald is an American politician and accountant serving as a member of the South Dakota House of Representatives from the 31st district. Elected in November 2020, she assumed office on January 12, 2021.

Early life and education 
Fitzgerald was born in Vermillion, South Dakota. She earned a Bachelor of Science degree in accounting and business administration from Black Hills State University in 1981.

Career 
From 2003 to 2012, Fitzgerald served as an economic assistance and benefits specialist at the South Dakota Department of Social Services. She then worked as an accountant for a regional convenience store and grocery store chain. Fitzgerald was elected to the South Dakota House of Representatives in November 2020 and assumed office on January 12, 2021. On July 8, 2021, Fitzgerald was selected to serve as a member of the Criminal Justice & Public Safety Committee of the Midwestern Legislative Conference.

References 

Living people
People from Vermillion, South Dakota
Black Hills State University alumni
Republican Party members of the South Dakota House of Representatives
Women state legislators in South Dakota
Year of birth missing (living people)